Peplometus is a genus of African jumping spiders that was first described by Eugène Louis Simon in 1900.  it contains only two species, found only in Africa: P. biscutellatus and P. chlorophthalmus.

References

Salticidae genera
Salticidae
Spiders of Africa